Udi Manber is an Israeli computer scientist. He is one of the authors of agrep and GLIMPSE. After a career in engineering and management, he worked on medical research.

Education
He earned both his bachelor's degree in 1975 in mathematics and his master's degree in 1978 from the Technion in Israel.  At the University of Washington, he earned another master's degree in 1981 and his PhD in computer science in 1982.

Career
He has won a Presidential Young Investigator Award in 1985, 3 best-paper
awards, and the Usenix annual Software Tools User Group Award software award in 1999. Together with Gene Myers he developed the suffix array, a data structure for string matching.

He was a professor at the University of Arizona and authored several articles while there, including "Using Induction to Design Algorithms" summarizing his textbook (which remains in print) Introduction to Algorithms: A Creative Approach.

He became the chief scientist at Yahoo! in 1998.

In 2002, he joined Amazon.com, where he became "chief algorithms officer" and a vice president. He later was appointed CEO of the Amazon subsidiary company A9.com. He filed a patent on behalf of Amazon. In 2004, Google promoted sponsored listings for its own recruiting whenever someone searched for his name on Google's search engine.

In 2006, he was hired by Google as one of their vice presidents of engineering. In December 2007, he announced Knol, Google's project to create a knowledge repository.

In October 2010, he was responsible for all the search products at Google.

In October 2014, Manber was named the vice president of engineering at YouTube.

In February 2015, Manber announced that he was leaving YouTube for the National Institutes of Health. He left the role in 2016.

In February 2017, Manber went to work for the Department of Medicine at the University of California, San Francisco and a technical advisor to UCSF's Institute for Computational Health Sciences.

In October 2018, it was reported that Manber was joining Anthem as its chief AI officer.

Manber serves on the board of directors for Twiggle and is an advisor to Amino Health.

In 2020, Manber announced a new venture called Weekly Medical News.

References

External links
 IT Conversations  podcast about Google search

Google employees
American technology chief executives
American computer businesspeople
American computer scientists
Israeli computer scientists
Jewish American writers
Year of birth missing (living people)
Living people
University of Arizona faculty
University of Washington alumni
Technion – Israel Institute of Technology alumni
University of California, San Francisco staff
21st-century American Jews